The 1980 Campeonato Brasileiro Série B, officially, the Taça de Prata 1980, was the 3rd edition of the Campeonato Brasileiro Série B. The championship was performed by 64 clubs, divided into 8 groups of 8 teams each, in which the first-placed team of each group proceeded to a playoff in which the winners would be promoted to the Second phase of the Copa Brasil of the same year. The losers would proceed to the second phase of the Taça de Prata, in which 20 teams (the losers of the promotion playoff, and the second and third-placed teams in each group)were divided into four groups of five teams. The winner of each group qualified to the semifinals, disputed in a knockout tournament format, in which the winners were promoted to the Taça de Ouro of the following year.

First phase

Group A

Group B

Group C

Group D

Group E

Group F

Group G

Group H

Promotion play-off

|}

Second phase

Group I

Group J

Group K

Group L

Semifinals

|}

Finals

First leg

Second leg

References

Sources
 RSSSF

Campeonato Brasileiro Série B seasons
B